is a broad word used to describe Japanese comedy as seen on television. The word owarai is the honorific form of the word warai (by adding o- prefix), meaning "a laugh" or "a smile". Owarai is most common on Japanese variety shows and the comedians are referred to as owarai geinin or owarai tarento. Presently Japan is considered to be in an "owarai boom", and many minor talents have been finding sudden fame after a gag or skit became popular.

Characteristics

Manzai, a traditional form of Japanese comedy that became the basis of many modern acts today, is characterized by a pair of usually older male comedians acting certain roles in a constant comedic battle against themselves. This tradition is continued in the acts of many modern talents. While there are many women talents, they are largely outnumbered by the men, and they tend to take more minor roles.

Whereas manzai performers traditionally wore kimono (traditional Japanese dress), these days a western suit is the outfit of choice for many owarai kombi (combination; referring to a pair of comedians in a unit) and many talents who begin their careers performing in a style very similar to stand-up comedy, usually including aspects of manzai and conte.

Some minor characteristics include frequently used sound effects (cheap, old-fashioned sound effects are used intentionally for comic effect), dajare (a Japanese-style pun), and dokkiri (a hidden-camera prank like those seen in the popular American show Candid Camera).

Owarai geinin

On television, most owarai geinin are introduced using their kombi name (e.g. Yoiko Hamaguchi) and some geinin even retain the name of their former groups after they have parted ways.

A few popular kombi include:
 Tunnels
 Downtown
 Ninety-nine
 Bakushō Mondai
 Gokuraku Tombo 
 Cocorico
 Kyaeen
 Audrey
 Untouchable 
 Impulse
 Othello, a rare female kombi
 Cream Stew
 Summers
 Neptune
 Jichō Kachō
 Sandwichman
 Speed Wagon
 TIM
 Tutorial
 Penalty
 Yoiko
 Rahmens
 Regular

Many owarai units have names based on English words or phrases. Kombi are usually included as guests for shows, though some (namely Downtown, Cream Stew, and Ninety-nine) often act as hosts as well.

Some popular talents that usually don't perform in units are:
  Ken Shimura
  Sanma Akashiya
  Tamori
  Beat Takeshi
  Cha Katō
  Shinsuke Shimada
  Tetsurō Degawa
  Egashira 2:50
  George Tokoro
  Teruyoshi Uchimura
  Daimaou Kosaka
  Koriki Chōshū
  Hiroshi
  Tsutomu Sekine
  Takashi Fujii
  Michiko Shimizu 
  Hori
  Sayaka Aoki, another rare female act
  Tomonori Jinnai
  Chihara Junior

Of these, Sanma, Tamori, and Beat Takeshi are sometimes referred to collectively as the "big three" because of their massive popularity. Talents such as these often act as hosts for shows, or perform together in small or large groups, something almost unimaginable for most western comedians.

Variety shows
Japanese variety shows are the main outlet for most owarai geinin and along with drama and anime they are some of the most popular shows on Japanese television.

As a general term in Japan, "variety show" can refer to "straight" variety shows with an appropriate myriad of topics, segments, and games. It is also  used for comedy oriented shows that focus more on stand-up and skits, and quiz/trivia type shows featuring comic elements. It is not to be expected that a variety show will always follow the same format, and guests from Japanese music and talent pools are frequent.

The variety style shows generally divided into segments of games, features,  and "corners", some very short and some shows focusing (for a special episode) solely on one game or feature. Trivia, quiz, or game shows in Japan are often considered owarai as the contestants of such shows are often a mix of owarai geinin and other Japanese talents of various descriptions. Game shows without any famous characters playing the role of contestants are rare.

Of these sections and games, many can be seen recurring on a variety of shows all across Japan. It may even be possible to classify Japanese variety shows (or at least the individual sections of the shows) according to the following formats:
Food judgement/tasting/making (various types of food are also commonly used as prizes for the winner of a game)
Travel (often travelling within Japan to view someones estate or around the world producing short, documentary-style segments about world culture, with a comic twist)
Physical challenges, tests of strength/endurance etc.
Tests of improvised comic skill (for example, a dajare contest)
Obstacle courses/collections of strange games or activities
Music (Either with real Japanese musicians, or with owarai geinin trying their hands at music (often karaoke style), covering popular songs or showing off their own)

Some concepts of variety shows are consistent over most of Japanese television, though they may be considered quite different from those seen in the western world. Many shows are made up of what are called VTRs, or video segments, and are usually introduced with a hand gesture and the word dōzo (the implied meaning is "let's have a look"), though this procedure is usually made into a joke with strange gestures instead of the usual wave.

A few popular variety/comedy shows of varying contents are:

  King of Comedy (showcasing the stand-up acts and skits of new and popular talent, often featuring VTR segments of the activities of various talents)
  The God of Entertainment (similar to King of Comedy, though focusing on stand-up acts)
  The Tunnels' Thanks to Everyone (the origin of the international Brain Wall television franchise, hosted by duo Tunnels) 
  Apron of Love (talents lacking cooking skill are asked to cook difficult dishes and are given harsh, though honest, judgements)
  SMAP×SMAP (the five members of the immensely popular group SMAP host many different shows, presenting segments such as music, cooking, and news)
  Zenigata Kintarō (this show's segment bimbō batoru (battle of the poor) showcases the life of two or more people living in Japan who support interesting life styles on minimum amounts of money; the funniest, or most inspiring bimbō wins)
 Matthew's Best Hit TV+ (hosted by the comedian Takashi Fujii, this show features musical guests and a strange variety of games and unrelated segments)
  Spring of Trivia (showcasing interesting and strange facts (or strange interpretations of boring facts) of little or no importance using a trivia-style format)
  Nep-league (featuring the owarai trio Neptune on one of the two teams of contestants, this quiz show features various "levels" of play challenging the players' knowledge of everything from world events to reading Japanese to spelling simple English words)
  Ken Shimura no Baka Tono-sama (hosted by comedian Ken Shimura)

See also
 List of Japanese comedians
 Manzai
 Glossary of owarai terms
 Nininbaori

Further reading

External links
 大笑い.com (oowarai.com)—Japanese site promoting owarai and owarai talents
 お笑い芸人相関図 (owarai geinin sōkanzu)—Japanese site with information on various owarai geinin and the relationships they have with other talents
 お笑い芸人図鑑 (owarai geinin zukan)—Japanese site, so-called encyclopedia of owarai geinin

Performing arts in Japan
Television in Japan
Japanese comedy